Pál Lágler (born 8 October 1913, date of death unknown) was a Hungarian international football player. He played for the Magyar Pamutipari Sport Club. He participated with the Hungary national football team at the 1936 Summer Olympics in Berlin.

References

External links
 

1913 births
Year of death missing
Hungarian footballers
Association football midfielders
Olympic footballers of Hungary
Footballers at the 1936 Summer Olympics